A New Sound A New Star: Jimmy Smith at the Organ Volume 2 (also released as The Champ) is an album by Jimmy Smith. The trio recording was made at Van Gelder Studio on March 27, 1956, and was released by Blue Note. The album was rereleased on CD combined with Smith's first LP, A New Sound... A New Star..., and the following The Incredible Jimmy Smith at the Organ.

Reception

The AllMusic review awarded the album 4½ stars. The All About Jazz reviewer commented that it was more bebop-based than the first volume.

Track listing
All compositions by Jimmy Smith, except as indicated.
 "The Champ" (Dizzy Gillespie) – 8:36
 "Bayou" – 4:52
 "Deep Purple" (Peter DeRose, Mitchell Parish) – 7:14
 "Moonlight in Vermont" (John Blackburn, Karl Suessdorf) – 4:32
 "Ready 'n Able" – 6:31
 "Turquoise" – 4:12
 "Bubbis" – 4:32
 Recorded at Rudy Van Gelder Studio, Hackensack, New Jersey on March 27, 1956

Personnel
 Jimmy Smith – organ
 Thornel Schwartz – guitar
 Donald Bailey – drums

Technical
 Alfred Lion – producer
 Rudy Van Gelder – engineer
 Reid Miles – cover design
 Francis Wolff – photography
 Babs Gonzales – liner notes

References

Blue Note Records albums
Jimmy Smith (musician) albums
1956 albums
Albums produced by Alfred Lion
Albums recorded at Van Gelder Studio